Phù Mỹ is a district (huyện) of Bình Định province in the South Central Coast region of Vietnam. The district capital is Phù Mỹ.

Geography 
Phù Mỹ borders Hoài Nhơn and Hoài Ân to the north, Phù Cát to the south, and the South China Sea to the east.

Transport and economy 
Most of the communes of Phù Mỹ district lie on National Route 1 that runs through the province from north to south.

References

Districts of Bình Định province